Unreliable Memoirs is a memoir by Australian writer Clive James published in 1980 by Jonathan Cape
The book was a bestseller, and the first of as series of autobiographical works. The book covers his childhood and youth in Sydney. It was followed by Falling Towards England, published in 1985.

References

External links
 Unreliable Memoirs at clivejames.com

1980 non-fiction books
Autobiographies
Jonathan Cape books